Esmeraldas is a coastal city in northwestern Ecuador. It is the seat of the Esmeraldas Canton and capital of the Esmeraldas Province. It has an international sea port and a small airport (IATA location identifier: ESM). Esmeraldas is the major seaport of northwestern Ecuador, and it lies on the Pacific coast at the mouth of the Esmeraldas River. It is exactly at the antipodes of Padang, Indonesia. The city is the principal trading hub for the region's agricultural and lumber resources, and is the terminus of the 313-mile (504-km) Trans-Ecuadorian Pipeline from the oil fields in northeastern Ecuador.

Esmeraldas is well known around Latin America given the large number of locals that have historically played in the Ecuador national football team.
The main activities of the city are commerce, industry and agriculture. It offers beautiful beaches with landscapes and a warm climate, which make it one of the most visited tourist destinations in the area.

On 19 December 2016, a 5.8 Richter scale earthquake shook the city of Esmeraldas.

Economy

The port of Esmeraldas is economically important for the northern part of Ecuador, and the port of Balao is an important oil processing facility. Here wood and wood chips are mainly exported; bananas and other agricultural products are also exported.

Agriculture and livestock
The soil allows the production of rice, maize, African Palm, albacá and a variety of tropical fruits. Among the main forest species are: chanul, raft, laurel, sande, guayacán, and tangaré. Cattle and pig rearing are also important. The fishing industry is also an important economic indicator of the region, and includes species like corvina, snapper, lisa and tuna.

Industry

Industry in Esmeraldas consists of manufacturing, timber, chemicals and oil. Concerns exist about forest management and deforestation in the Chaco rainforest.

The trans-Andean pipeline was completed in August 1972, connecting the Oriente reserves to refining facilities in Esmeraldas, and the oil industry is the largest employer. The plant is currently running at 80 percent capacity with hopes to return to full capacity by 2014. The petrol produced there is used for mixtures because of its high aromaticity.

Climate 
Like most of the Ecuador coast, Esmeraldas has a hot semi-arid climate (Köppen BSh) with a wet season from January to April, a dry season from May to December, and consistently very warm to hot and cloudy weather due to fog from the Humboldt Current.

Tourism

Tourist attractions include beaches, virgin forests, the culture of the indigenous Cayapas people, marimba and Afro-Ecuadorian music and the La Tolita archaeological zone. Other attractions include Atacames, famous for the "crazy coconut" (coco-loco, traditional drink made with coconut water) and its handicrafts in black and red coral. Same, an area of large palms and serene blue waters; Muisne, with pristine beaches of warm sand inhabited by red crabs in a tropical atmosphere; Quinindé, with vast African palm trees and guadúa houses; and Tonsupa, famous for its beautiful sunsets. 

The U.S. State Department advises not to travel to the northern border region of Ecuador, including the northern part of Esmeraldas, due to crime.

Infrastructure

The main road runs along the coast by joining La Tola, Lagarto, Montalvo, Rocafuerte, Río Verde, Camarones, Tachina y San Mateo. Other routes are: Esmeraldas - Atacames - Súa - La Unión - Muisne - Esmeraldas - Quinindé (Rosa Zarate) that lead to Santo Domingo and Quito. The Quito - San Lorenzo rail network is still in use.

The Carlos Concha Torres International Airport has offered both national and international services to Cali, Colombia.

Notable people
 

Pervis Estupiñán (born 1998), footballer for Brighton & Hove Albion
Darwin Rivas (born 1990), footballer
Enner Valencia (born 1989), footballer who currently plays as a forward for Turkish club Fenerbahçe and captains the Ecuador national team.

References

External links

Map of Esmeraldas 

Populated places in Esmeraldas Province
Populated coastal places in Ecuador
Port cities in Ecuador
Provincial capitals in Ecuador
Populated places established in 1526
1526 establishments in the Spanish Empire